Melanoplus huroni, known generally as the Huron short-wing grasshopper or Huron short-winged locust, is a species of spur-throated grasshopper in the family Acrididae. It is found in North America.

References

Further reading

 
 

Melanoplinae